Laurent Gerstmans (26 February 1885 – 3 April 1955) was a Belgian wrestler. He competed in the heavyweight event at the 1912 Summer Olympics.

References

External links
 

1885 births
1955 deaths
Olympic wrestlers of Belgium
Wrestlers at the 1912 Summer Olympics
Belgian male sport wrestlers
Sportspeople from Antwerp